You Know I Love You may refer to:
 "You Know I Love You", a song by The Pigeon Detectives off of the album Wait for Me
 "You Know I Love You" (B.B. King song)
"You Know I Love You... Don't You?", a song by Howard Jones